Andrea Gibson (born August 13, 1975) is an American poet and activist from Calais, Maine, who has lived in Boulder, Colorado since 1999. Gibson's poetry focuses on gender norms, politics, social reform, and LGBTQ topics.

Personal life 

Gibson grew up in Calais, Maine. They have one sister, Laura, who is mentioned in a poem "The Moon Is a Kite". Growing up in a Baptist home and attending local schools, they later attended Saint Joseph's College of Maine.

Moving with a girlfriend, Gibson lived for a time in New Orleans, and later the two moved in 1999 to Boulder, Colorado, where they settled. They went to their first open-mic in Denver, where Gibson was inspired to become a spoken word artist.

Gibson uses gender-neutral pronouns, specifically they/them/theirs. Many of their poems are about gender identity, such as "Swing Set" and "Andrew". Gibson has said, regarding gender, "I don't necessarily identify within a gender binary. I've never in my life really felt like a woman and I've certainly never felt like a man. I look at gender on a spectrum and I feel somewhere on that spectrum that's not landing on either side of that." Regarding appellation, Gibson has expressed affinity for a variety of names, stating "The names my loved ones call me that I love being called: Andrea. Andrew. Andy. Anderson. Dre. Gibby. Gib. Gibbs. Gibba. Sam. Faye. Pangee."

Gibson has been diagnosed with Chronic Lyme Disease, and they have spoken openly about their experiences with CLD - both in terms of physical suffering and in difficulty accessing care and treatment. They have worked towards spreading awareness of CLD.

They have ovarian cancer and are undergoing chemotherapy.

Poetry 

A four-time Denver Grand Slam Champion, Gibson finished fourth at the 2004 National Poetry Slam, and third at both the 2006 and 2007 Individual World Poetry Slam. In 2008, Gibson became the first poet ever to win the Women of the World Poetry Slam (WOWps) in Detroit.

In 2008, Gibson published their first book, Pole Dancing To Gospel Hymns. This was followed by The Madness Vase and Pansy, all published by Write Bloody Publishing. Gibson has also written and published Take Me With You, a book of quotes and phrases. In 2018, they published Lord of the Butterflies.

The album Yellowbird incorporates music with spoken word. Confronting fear was a theme in poems of the following album, Flower Boy. Gibson also released Truce in 2013, followed by Hey Galaxy in 2018.

Gibson cites Sonya Renee Taylor, Derrick Brown, Anis Mojgani, Patricia Smith, and Mary Oliver as influences. Throughout the year, Gibson tours universities and other venues across the country.

Gibson often performs poems at Button Poetry.

Activism 

In addition to using poetry to provide social and political commentary on gender and LGBTQ issues, Gibson is involved with many activist groups, and also performs at Take Back the Night events. For twenty years, Gibson performed with Vox Feminista, a "performance tribe of radical feminists bent on social change through cultural revolution."

In 2013, alongside Kelsey Gibb, Gibson launched the website and support system, Stay Here With Me. The tumblr account for Stay Here With Me presents it as "an interactive, safe space offering collective support while encouraging individual healing to keep those who visit alive today, and wanting to stay alive until tomorrow."

Discography
Bullets and Windchimes (2003)
Swarm (2004)
When the Bough Breaks (2006)
Yellowbird (2009)
Flower Boy (2011)
 Truce (2013)
 Hey Galaxy (2018)

Books
Pole Dancing to Gospel Hymns (2008)
The Madness Vase (2012)
Pansy (2015)
Take Me With You (2018)
Lord of the Butterflies (2018)
How Poetry Can Change Your Heart (2019)
You Better Be Lightning (2021)

Awards and honors 
Gibson is a four-time Denver Grand Slam Champion. They placed fourth in the 2004 National Poetry Slam and third in the 2006 and 2007 Individual World Poetry Slam. Gibson was the first person to win the Women of the World Poetry Slam in 2008.

References

External links 
 
 Audio of "Andrew," "For Eli," "See-Through," "Walmart," "Swingset," and "Blue Blanket" (among others) on Indiefeed Performance Poetry Channel
 Video of Andrea Gibson from June 2009 at Da Poetry Lounge in West Hollywood, CA – on Poetry.LA

Living people
Bowdoin College alumni
Saint Joseph's College of Maine alumni
People from Calais, Maine
American spoken word poets
1975 births
Writers from Boulder, Colorado
American LGBT poets
LGBT people from Maine
21st-century American poets
21st-century LGBT people
Non-binary activists
American non-binary writers